The Shuggling Stone or "Clochnabogaddy" is a 13-ton boulder that sits at the edge of the moorland road between the Lackagh Bridge and Glen village in County Donegal in Ireland.

It is called the Shuggling Stone because it "shuggles" very easily. "Shuggling" is an Irish word meaning to rattle, shake or jiggle something. With the aid of a short stick the huge boulder can be rocked or "shuggled" backwards and forwards.

The stone is a lump of glacial granite and was first recorded in 1834 by Lt. Lancey during the first Ordnance Survey of Ireland; he noted then that it could be rocked back and forth with one finger.

References

Granite formations
Geology of Ireland
Geography of County Donegal